Lophiosilurus alexandri is a species of catfish (order Siluriformes) of the family Pseudopimelodidae, and the only species of the monotypic genus Lophiosilurus.

Distribution and habitat
This fish originates from the São Francisco River in Brazil. Here, it is commonly known as pacamã. It prefers lentic habitats. This species has been introduced into the Doce River basin, but its effect on the native species has not been studied.

Description and ecology
It has an extremely large mouth, earning it the name Pac-Man catfish.

L. alexandri is a sedentary species. This species has adhesive eggs and the male displays parental care.

L. alexandri represents an example of parallel evolution, sharing a similar morphology and lifestyle to species of the distantly related Chaca catfish.

Relationship to humans
L. alexandri is considered threatened by Brazil's Ministry of the Environment.

L. alexandri has economic potential for aquaculture. It is a rarely imported aquarium fish. These fish require a sandy substrate and should not be maintained with fish that it can eat (a fish less than half of its size).

References

Pseudopimelodidae
Fish of South America
Fish of Brazil
Taxa named by Franz Steindachner
Fish described in 1876